Stempflesee is an artificial lake in Augsburg-Haunstetten, Swabia, Bavaria, Germany. Its surface area is 0. 014 km2.

Lakes of Bavaria